Blue Moon Rising may refer to:
Blue Moon Rising (novel), a novel by Simon R. Green
Blue Moon Rising (film), a 2010 sport documentary film
"Blue Moon Rising", a song by Gomez from Liquid Skin